Medicine Man is a 1992 American adventure drama film directed by John McTiernan. The film stars Sean Connery and Lorraine Bracco, and features an acclaimed score by veteran composer Jerry Goldsmith.

Plot 
The pharmaceutical company Aston Laboratories sends biochemist Dr. Rae Crane into the Amazonian rainforest to locate researcher Robert Campbell, after his wife and research partner abandon him. Crane is bringing equipment and supplies, but Campbell is upset the research partner is not forthcoming. He tries to send Crane home, but she demurs, as she has been assigned to determine whether Campbell's research deserves continued funding.

Campbell has found a "cure for cancer", but attempts to synthesize the compound have failed. With supplies of the successful serum running low, Campbell isolates a derivative of a species of flower from which the formula can be synthesized and with Crane's help is determined to find its source. Campbell earns the title "medicine man" of the village by giving a boy with a stomach ache Alka Seltzer, insulting the real medicine man and driving him deep into the forest. A logging company is building a road headed straight for the village, threatening to expose the native population to potentially lethal foreign pathogens, as has happened before. In fact, Campbell's wife left him because he could not forgive himself for the tragedy.

A small boy appears with malignant neoplasms and Campbell, Crane, the boy, and his father set out in search of Campbell's predecessor, a medicine man from whom Campbell once acquired his knowledge of flowers. Upon encountering Campbell's entourage, the medicine man flees in fear. Though he is reluctant to pursue the man further, Crane convinces him circumstances demand that he must. Campbell rescues Crane from a fall, then locates the medicine man, whom he is compelled to fight in order to heal the medicine man's wounded pride and gain further necessary information. Unfortunately, the medicine man reveals that the flowers have no "juju"—power to heal. Father and son agree to return another time. Back at the village, Crane initially refuses to allow Campbell to inoculate the boy with the last of the serum until more can be synthesized. But when the boy's condition worsens, she gives in and the boy is inoculated.

The next morning, the boy is better but the village is in tumult. The logging road is nearly finished. Campbell appeals to the company's workers to halt construction until he can conclude his research, but it refuses. In desperation and after new samples fail to contain the missing compound, Crane runs the chromatograph one more time and accidentally discovers that the source of the cure is not the flower but a species of rare ant indigenous to the rainforest. Campbell demands the construction stop. A fight results and a bulldozer catches fire, destroying the village and the research station along with many acres of rainforest.

The next day, Crane promises to send Campbell new equipment and the research assistant he'd originally requested. She is about to return home when she meets the medicine man. He symbolically passes on his mantle to Campbell, and Crane accepts an invitation to continue working with him in exchange for recognition for co-discovering the source of the compound.

Cast
 Sean Connery as Dr. Robert Campbell
 Lorraine Bracco as Dr. Rae Crane
 José Wilker as Dr. Miguel Ornega
 José Lavat as Government Man

Production
Tom Schulman's script was purchased for $2.5 million with a further $1 million spent on rewrites by Sally Robinson and Tom Stoppard.

Production started March 4, 1991 in the Mexican jungle near Catemaco and was completed in July. Connery and Bracco both complained of conditions on set.

Soundtrack

The music for Medicine Man was composed and conducted by veteran composer Jerry Goldsmith. The score, a blend of orchestra, synthetic elements, and guitar solos, was praised by critics and is considered one of the film's strengths. The soundtrack was released February 4, 1994 through Varèse Sarabande and features fourteen tracks.

 "Rae's Arrival" (5:06) 
 "First Morning" (3:46)
 "Campbell and the Children" (1:57)
 "The Trees" (6:01)
 "The Harvest" (3:11)
 "Mocara" (3:36)
 "Mountain High" (2:41)
 "Without a Net" (4:19)
 "Finger Painting" (2:30)
 "What's Wrong" (1:52)
 "The Injection" (2:09)
 "The Sugar" (2:08)
 "The Fire" (2:10)
 "A Meal and a Bath" (8:03)

Reception

Box office
The film premiered at the El Capitan Theatre in Los Angeles on February 5, 1992. It was released in 1,304 theatres on February 7, 1992.

The film debuted at number 1 at the US box office with $8.5 million. The following week it was knocked out of the top spot by Wayne's World. The film eventually grossed $45.5 million domestically, earning Disney $21 million, just half of its budget.

Critical response
The film was panned by most critics, especially Bracco's performance. On Rotten Tomatoes the film has an approval rating of 17% rating based on 23 reviews. Audiences surveyed by CinemaScore gave the film a grade of "B+" on scale of A+ to F.

Roger Ebert of the Chicago Sun-Times gave it 1.5 out of 4 and wrote: "All of the elements are here for a movie I would probably enjoy very much, but somehow they never come together" and "If this had been some dumb adventure movie, it would probably have been terrific."
Owen Gleiberman of Entertainment Weekly wrote "It's not every day you get to see a performance as bad as Lorraine Bracco's in Medicine Man" and Connery "doesn’t do much he hasn't done before". Gleiberman praised some moments where the film "becomes the dazzling true-life jungle saga it clearly wants to be" but is critical of the plot which he says is "built around some very tired devices" and "The race-against-the-clock structure is a flimsy conceit". He gave it a grade C+.
Variety called it "An indelicate attempt to create some African Queen-style magic while curing cancer and saving the rainforests in the bargain, this jumbo-budget two-character piece suffers from a very weak script and a lethal job of miscasting."

About the film's lackluster performance, John McTiernan said: "It was a little art movie with Sean Connery that cost only $27 million. If the press hadn't defined it as an action movie, it probably wouldn't have been considered a disappointment."

 
Lorraine Bracco's performance in the film earned her a nomination for the Golden Raspberry Award for Worst Actress.

See also
 Richard Evans Schultes, an American ethnobotanist who conducted inaugural research in the Amazon rainforest

References

External links 
 
 
 
 

1992 films
1992 drama films
1990s romance films
American adventure drama films
1990s English-language films
Films scored by Jerry Goldsmith
Films about Native Americans
Films directed by John McTiernan
Films set in the 1990s
Films set in the Amazon
Films set in Brazil
Films set in jungles
Films shot in Mexico
Films produced by Andrew G. Vajna
Hollywood Pictures films
Medical-themed films
Cinergi Pictures films
1990s American films